William Kerns (September 6, 1840 – March 6, 1913) was an Ontario businessman and political figure. He represented Halton in the Legislative Assembly of Ontario from 1883 to 1898 as a Conservative member.

He was born in Nelson Township, Halton County, Upper Canada in 1840, the son of Nicholas Kerns, who came to Upper Canada from Germany. After Kerns completed his schooling, he entered business as a merchant, first partnering with John Waldie and later becoming sole owner of the business. He was also vice president of the Federal Life Insurance Company of Hamilton. In 1868, he married Ellen Morrison. Kerns served on the school board for ten years, as reeve for Burlington from 1879 to 1882 and from 1899 to 1905 and as chairman of the finance committee of Halton County. He was a lieutenant-colonel in the local militia and also was a member of the local Masonic lodge and a county master in the Orange Order. He died in 1913.

References

External links 
The Canadian parliamentary companion, 1897 JA Gemmill
Member's parliamentary history for the Legislative Assembly of Ontario
A Cyclopæedia of Canadian biography : being chiefly men of the time ... GM Rose (1886)
From Pathway to Skyway : a history of Burlington, C Emery & BJ Ford (1967)

1840 births
1913 deaths
Progressive Conservative Party of Ontario MPPs